The New Zealand DB class and DBR class locomotive is a type of diesel-electric locomotive built for service on New Zealand's rail network. They were built by General Motors Diesel (GMD) of Canada as a narrow-gauge version of the EMD G8 model, with seventeen locomotives constructed. Ten of these were later rebuilt into the DBR class.

Introduction 
The DB class was introduced to the rail network in 1965-1966 as a result of a requirement for a modern locomotive that could operate on the North Island lines that the DA class was excluded from due to their weight and axle load. They were ordered at the same time as the final DA order was placed. While these were mainly branch lines, it also applied to the East Coast Main Trunk line, particularly the section beyond Paeroa through the Karangahake and Athenree gorges until the opening of the Kaimai Tunnel in 1978.

The class was virtually indistinguishable externally from the DA class, being of the same basic design and dimensions, and wearing the same livery. They were some 13 tonnes lighter with a V8 prime as opposed to a V12, though they shared the same A1A-A1A wheel configuration and traction motors for commonality with the DA fleet.

Numbering 
The class was initially numbered DB 1000 to DB 1016, this being in common with NZR practice of the time to number locomotive classes with reference to the power output.

Upon the introduction of the computerised Traffic Monitoring System (TMS) in 1979 the class was renumbered and the designation capitalised. The class received new four-digit numbers beginning with 1, in which the last number is a check digit for the whole number. Under the new system DB 1001 retained its number, becoming DB 1001, with DB 1000 becoming DB1018. The rest of class was renumbered in sequence, with DB 1016 becoming DB1180.

The units being rebuilt to DBR received a new TMS number in the 12XX range when they entered the rebuilding cycle.

Rebuild to DBR 

In the late 1970s the decision was undertaken to rebuild the DB class along similar lines to that being undertaken for the DA class into the DC class. The rebuilt DB units were designated as DBR (R = rebuild). The work was undertaken by Clyde Engineering in Australia and involved the lowering of the short hood to improve visibility for the driver, new cabs and the installation of a new EMD 8-645 engine. Ten units were rebuilt between 1980 and 1982.

In service 
The DB class was employed primarily freight duties, though they did also see occasional service hauling passenger trains. As lines and bridges were upgraded, and in the case of the ECMT the Kaimai Tunnel opening, the weight advantage the locomotives had over other classes used in the North Island became less of a factor and the locomotives were operated as part of a general pool.

Initially, all DBR class locomotives were allocated to the North Island. The lightweight nature of the DBR locomotives meant they were well suited to operate some South Island lines following the withdrawal of the DI and DJ class locomotives in the early 1990s. The last DBR returned north from the South Island around 2007.

Auckland Transport 
From 2003 to 2014 two locomotives were leased to the Auckland Regional Transport Authority and then its successor, Auckland Transport, with the services operated under contract by Transdev. The two locomotives, DBRs 1199 and 1254 are operated in a top and tail configuration with the five car SX carriages set and wore the full MAXX Blue livery. A third unit, DBR 1226, was also painted in MAXX Blue but without the MAXX logo. DBR 1226 was usually used for freight services or work trains by KiwiRail but was used as back up for DBR 1199 or DBR 1254 as it had the necessary modifications to work with the suburban carriages. The leases expired in 2014 and the locomotives returned to freight service.

Wellington bankers 
For many years two DBR class locomotives formed the basis of a banker set out of Wellington, primarily assisting trains between Wellington and Paekakariki but also performing multiple other jobs including the Hutt Workshops shunt, work trains around the region and any unusual movements. DBRs 1199 and 1200 were the initial pair, becoming known as the "Bobsy Twins" (sp), likely a reference to the Bobbsey Twins due mainly to their consecutive numbers (a rarity under the TMS numbering system). In the early 2000s DBR1199 suffered a failure and was withdrawn from service and laid up, replaced on the banker set by DBR1267. DBR1199 was later sent to Hillside for repair and use on the Auckland SX set commuter trains, by which time the pairing of DBRs 1200 and 1267 had become known simply as "The Twins". DBR1267 was later transferred to Auckland to replace DBR1282, with the Wellington banking role taken over by other locomotives.

Livery 
The locomotives were delivered in the same overall deep red livery as the DA class, with the same white stripes along the sides and "wings" on the ends. With the introduction of TMS the locomotives road numbers were applied in large white numbers to the long hoods.

This livery was worn by many of the original DBs until their retirement, while the DBRs were returned to service in the International Orange or "Fruit Salad" scheme (red and grey with yellow safety ends) being applied to most NZR locomotive classes at the time. DBs 1082 and 1099 also received this livery in the 1980s.

DBR 1295 was repainted into the Toll Rail "Corn Cob" scheme (yellow and green), and the three units used on Auckland services have received the MAXX Blue livery (deep blue and yellow). More recently DBR 1267 has received the KiwiRail grey, red and yellow scheme.

Withdrawal and disposal 

The locomotives were withdrawn on account of being either surplus to requirements, or in poor mechanical condition. In the early 2000s, DBRs 1199, 1239 and 1241 were withdrawn and placed into storage at Hutt Workshops. However, 1199 was reinstated a year later for suburban trains in Auckland, and 1239 and 1241 were scrapped at Hutt Workshops in February 2008.

A few more were laid-up over the next few months. In , 1267, 1282 and 1295 were reinstated due to the DL class locomotives being taken out of service after samples from one locomotive tested positive for asbestos. Withdrawals began again in May of that year when 1282 was laid up. The rest have been withdrawn, with 1226 being the last.

In June 2017, KiwiRail issued a Request for Quotation (RFQ) via the Government Electronic Tendering Service (GETS). In August 2017, it was announced that DBRs 1254 and 1295 have been purchased by the Glenbrook Vintage Railway. The remaining DBRs were originally sold to an locomotive/rolling stock dealer in South Africa, but have now been sold to DBM Contracting.

Preservation 
In August 2017, it was announced by the Glenbrook Vintage Railway that they had purchased DBRs 1254 and 1295 for eventually hauling mainline excursions. After being stored at Hutt Workshops, the pair arrived on-site on 3 November 2017. In March 2018, 1295 was repainted in the "International Orange" livery. In May 2018, work started on overhauling 1254 for mainline certification. Both have been given GVR numbers, which are No.11 and No.12 respectively. DBR 1254's restoration was completed in September 2019, and is now mainline certified.

References

Footnotes

Citations

Bibliography

 
 
 

DB DBR class
A1A-A1A locomotives
General Motors Diesel locomotives
3 ft 6 in gauge locomotives of New Zealand
Railway locomotives introduced in 1965